Robert Rosser (born April 11, 1969) is an American biathlete. He competed in the men's 20 km individual event at the 1998 Winter Olympics.

References

External links
 

1969 births
Living people
American male biathletes
Olympic biathletes of the United States
Biathletes at the 1998 Winter Olympics
People from Plattsburgh, New York
U.S. Army World Class Athlete Program
20th-century American people